Bennett Creek is a tributary stream in Hidalgo County, New Mexico.

References

Rivers of Hidalgo County, New Mexico
Rivers of New Mexico